The 2011 European Figure Skating Championships was an international figure skating competition in the 2010–11 season. Skaters competed in the categories of men's singles, ladies' singles, pair skating, and ice dancing.

The 2011 competition was held from 24 to 30 January 2011 at the PostFinance Arena in Bern, Switzerland.

Qualification
The competition was open to skaters from a European member nations of the International Skating Union who had reached the age of 15 before 1 July 2010. The corresponding competition for non-European skaters was the 2011 Four Continents Championships. Based on the results of the 2010 European Championships, each country was allowed between one and three entries per discipline. National associations selected their entries based on their own criteria but those skaters had to achieve a minimum technical elements score (TES) at an international event prior to the European Championships. The minimum TES for each discipline and segment were:

With the exception of pairs, skaters who were ranked lower in the World Standings list also had to skate in a preliminary round before the main event. For advancement, the men's event required a top-11 finish; the ladies', a top-10 finish; and the ice dance, a top-8 finish.

The following countries earned more than one entry to the 2011 European Championships based on performance at the 2010 event.

Entries

Schedule
There was no preliminary round for pairs due to the low number of entries.

Competition notes

The temperatures at the Swiss venue were unusually cold for a skating event, reaching minus-3 Celsius. ISU President Ottavio Cinquanta conceded it was something new to have the event in such conditions and said the ISU would be more vigilant in the future. Many spectators used blankets to keep warm during the long hours of competition. Skaters also admitted they were affected by the cold, and Russian Alexander Smirnov said that he felt like the muscles weren't ready and jokingly added "If we had known about the temperature earlier, we would have prepared for it at home in St. Petersburg by skating naked," adding that "it is a little strange that a competition of this level would be held under these conditions. But the conditions are the same for everyone." German pair team Maylin Hausch and Daniel Wende aborted an Axel lasso lift on the take-off, with Wende later saying "Already after the first minute I felt like shock frozen; just before the first lift I had no feeling in my fingers and in my legs. I couldn't do anything to prevent it." The practice rink also received some criticism, with Nóra Hoffmann saying, "It was so white and everybody got lost in it. That was specially my problem there, I was so lost in the rink that I couldn't really focus, I didn't know where I was going."

In men's singles, Florent Amodio won the European title in his debut. He became the first skater to win Europeans in his first appearance at the event since Ilia Kulik did so in 1995. Brian Joubert won his tenth consecutive Europeans medal, equaling the record of most medals by a singles skater, previously set by Ulrich Salchow and matched by Karl Schäfer. In the ladies event, Sarah Meier, a previous medalist, ended her competitive career with her first European title in front of her home crowd. It was Switzerland's first gold in ladies' singles since Denise Biellmann's win at the 1981 event. In the pairs event, Aliona Savchenko / Robin Szolkowy won their fourth European title, edging out defending champions Yuko Kavaguti / Alexander Smirnov. Nathalie Pechalat / Fabian Bourzat, who had finished fourth in 2009 and 2010, reached their first ISU Championship podium and captured the gold in the ice dance event. It was France's fifth European ice dancing title after 1962, 2000, 2002, and 2007. This was the final competitive event for ice dance bronze medalists Sinead Kerr / John Kerr.

Results

Men

Ladies

Pairs

Ice dancing

Medals summary

Medals by country
Table of medals for overall placement:

Table of small medals for placement in the short segment:

Table of small medals for placement in the free segment:

Medalists
Medals for overall placement:

Small medals for placement in the short segment:

Small medals for placement in the free segment:

References

External links

 
 Photos of the European Championships 2011
 Schedule
 ISU site
 starting orders/detailed results

European Figure Skating Championships
European
E
Figure skating in Switzerland
International figure skating competitions hosted by Switzerland